The Office of Historical Corrections is a short story collection by American writer Danielle Evans. Published by Riverhead Books on November 10, 2020, the collection consists of six short stories and a novella (after which the collection is named) that deal with topics of race, loss, legacy, and loneliness in America. It was nominated for The Story Prize and the Chautauqua Prize, and received the 2021 Joyce Carol Oates Literary Prize.

Stories
Happily Ever After, a woman struggles with the legacy of cancer in her family.
Richard Of York Gave Battle In Vain, a photojournalist attends the wedding of a man she accidentally met, and is met with deep suspicion by the bride who believes she might have had an affair with the groom.
Boys Go to Jupiter, a white teenager becomes embroiled in a scandal at her university when a picture of her in a confederate flag bikini goes viral.
Alcatraz, a woman tries to cheer up her mother after she loses a court battle to clear her grandfather's name by reconnecting with the white family members she was separated from as a child.
Why Won't Women Just Say What They Want, a misogynistic artist issues a series of public apologies to the women he has wronged.
Anything Could Disappear, a young woman relocating to New York City to start a new life in the midst of the Great Recession hits a speed bump when a complete stranger abandons her placid baby with her.
The Office of Historical Corrections (novella), a D.C. woman works for the Institute of Public History, jokingly nicknamed The Office of Historical Corrections, trying to combat the epidemic of misinformation in American society. When she is sent to Wisconsin on a mission to amend her ex-co-worker's correction she ends up uncovering the dark truth of one family's past.

Themes 
The book's stories center apologies, corrections, and "making things right", per the author Danielle Evans.

Publication 
2021. The Office of Historical Corrections, Danielle Evans, Riverhead Books. Pub date 2020 November 10, hardcover .

Reception
The collection was widely praised for Evans deft handling of the themes of the work. The New York Times praised the collection as weaving together "Melvillian mundanity with melodramatic suspense". In a starred review Kirkus Reviews praised the collection as a whole calling the stories "[n]ecessary narratives, brilliantly crafted". Ian MacAllen of the Chicago Review of Books applauded the writing as "tightly structured, compact and efficient, driven by wry wit and Evans’s keen observations." Chaya Bhuvaneswar reviewed The Office of Historical Collections in the Washington Post: "this book will make readers face the news with renewed emotion, emotion all the more potent for the devastation that history has wrought on Evans’s characters, and on all of us."

Two stories were previously included in The Best American Short Stories anthologies.

Accolades 
 2020 - O Magazine 20 Best Books of 2020
 2020 - The Story Prize, Finalist
 2021 - Aspen Words Literary Prize, Finalist
 2021 - The Chautauqua Prize, Finalist
 2021 - Joyce Carol Oates Literary Prize, Winner

References

External links 
 The Office of Historical Collections on Penguin Random House

2020 short story collections
Literature by African-American women
American short story collections
Riverhead Books books